Batavia High School is a public high school located in Batavia, Ohio.  It is the only high school in the Batavia Local School District. It has about 625 students, and recently started open enrollment. The school mascot is the Bulldog. The school is located 20 miles east of Cincinnati within the village of Batavia, which is a village of about 1,700 people and is the county seat of Clermont County.  The school district encompasses the village and surrounding areas serving a total population of approximately 14,300. Batavia High School is a participant with the Southern Buckeye Conference, or SBAAC, and the rival of the Batavia Bulldog sports teams are the Williamsburg Wildcats.

History of Batavia High School 
The village of Batavia was founded in 1814. The first settler in the area was Ezekiel Dimmitt, of whom often paid itinerant teachers to come school not only his children, but children of other locals throughout the area.

There had been several designated areas throughout the village for the teaching of children, including a public school established at a Presbyterian Church, which was a small frame building located on the east side of market street, with two teachers, and a wooden floor with a hold in it that was used for discipline. The other unofficial Establishment was a log malt house that was part of a deserted distillery at the head of Spring Street.

The next building to house the youth of Batavia include the first building built as a school, which was an eight-room brick building on the upper end of Main Street that can still be seen today, existing as a private residence and church. It was here that the citizens of Clermont County took advantage of the Akron Law, which provided for the establishment of school boards, and allowed for an organized school to be produced. On June 1, 1850, Batavia became the first community in Clermont County to take advantage of the Akron Law, and created the School of District #1 of Batavia Township, possessing a Board of Education and creating Batavia Local Schools. The first president of the schools was Edward Scofield.

Student Body 
At Batavia High School, of the total enrolled, about 9% are part of a minority group, with American Indian/Alaskan Native enrollment being 0.4%, Asian enrollment being 0.4%, African American enrollment being 2%, Hispanic enrollment being 2%, and two or more races being 4%. White enrollment takes up 91% of the student body. Gender is split 50%-50%, and the total percentage of economically disadvantaged students at Batavia High School is 38%.

Academics 
Approximately 625 students attend Batavia High School, with 528 attending the High school campus full-time, and the rest either to the Great Oaks Career Center or full-time at the college campuses for CCP credit.

Batavia High School offers a few Advanced Placement (AP) classes, including:
 AP Biology
 AP U.S. History
 AP Calculus AB
 AP Environmental Science
The AP participation rate is 23% at Batavia High School.

Batavia High school also offers a variety of tests at its facilities, offering the ASVAB test on two separate dates in the 2015–2016 school year, as well as the American Legion's Americanism Test two separate years, in the 2013-2014 and 2015-2016 school years. Batavia High School seats several sittings of the ACT, offering four sittings in the 2015–2016 school year. Batavia also offers a sitting for the PSAT/NMSQT.

Further, Batavia High School has become more involved with the newly created CCP, or College Credit Plus programs created to allow High school students to take college credits at local universities. Batavia High School students are eligible for both Southern State and the University of Cincinnati- Clermont Campus credits. Several CCP classes are also taught on campus at the high school by several qualified teachers, with most of the AP classes doubling as CCP Credit through one of the two universities listed.

Students are also given the option to dually attend several of the Great Oaks Vocational Career Campuses, choosing to go to one of four available campuses.

Extracurricular activities 
Batavia students have a variety of clubs they can participate in, with many opportunities being presented in both the National Honor Society and Business Professionals of America (BPA) at Batavia. The National Honor Society participates in Leadership Conferences, such as the Anthony Munoz Youth Leadership Seminar, and around the school events. The NHS also funds a scholarship offered to Non-NHS members of the Batavia student body in honor of Alan Gordon.

The Batavia BPA sponsors fundraisers and organizes events. The BPA participates yearly in the Polar Plunge for Special Olympics, in the past being one of the top teams to raise money for the event.

The Interact Club at Batavia is sponsored by the Batavia Rotary. They participate within the community and actively do volunteer work.

The Batavia Student Council is also an active part of the student body, working with the Batavia Student Representatives to organize Prom, Homecoming, Spirit Weeks, and most recently, working with the BPA for the State Farm Celebrate My Drive, a national awards sweepstakes that Batavia High School has won twice; winning a $25,000 grant in the 2013–2014 school year, and then $100,000 in the 2014–2015 school year.

The Batavian,  formerly known as The Echo,  is the yearbook of Batavia High School. It is put together in cooperation with a teacher sponsor, students of all grades, and produced using Josten's software.

The Science Department at Batavia also participates in the Clermont County Science Challenge, and had a team place fourth, and by technicality, be able to proceed to the 2013-2014 Science Olympiad, and had a team place third and proceed to the Science Olympiad in the 2015–2016 school year.

Several Spanish class sponsored trips have been undertaken by Kevin Scheel at Batavia High School through EF Education First, having students journey to Costa Rica in the 2010–2011 school year, to Peru in the 2014–2015 school year, to Spain in the 2017–2018 school year, and to Europe in the 2021-2022 school year.

Athletics 
The Batavia Bulldogs sports teams participate in the Southern Buckeye Conference, offering the following sports teams:
 Batavia Men's Varsity Soccer
 Batavia Men's Jr. Varsity Soccer
 Batavia Girls' Varsity Soccer
 Batavia Girls' Jr. Varsity Soccer
 Batavia Girls' Tennis
 Batavia Men's Tennis
 Batavia Golf Team
 Batavia Football
 Batavia Girls' Volleyball
 Batavia Cross Country
 Batavia Academic Quiz Team
 Batavia Boys' Basketball
 Batavia Girls' Basketball
 Batavia Wrestling
 Batavia Softball
 Batavia Bulldog Baseball
 Batavia Swim Team
The high school campus is home to Holman Stadium, and the Stadium is used by the Football, Men's Soccer, Girls' Soccer. and Cross Country teams during their regular seasons. The high school houses one gymnasium, doubling as a performance space for the Music Department, although it is ill-equipped for such a job. The swim team uses the local YMCA's facilities. The campus also has vast practice fields, recently installing a fence for soccer practice fields, and also possesses baseball/softball diamonds. 

The campus originally had more space for training fields, however, in the year of 2015 construction began on the new Batavia Elementary School, moving from the village address of 215 Broadway, Batavia, OH and the old building to a newly built $22 million complex that is set to be completed by the fall of 2016.

The Batavia Bulldogs teams participated in the OHSAA Southwest Region athletic conferences since 1919, which was formed as the Clermont County League in 1919 and changed its name to the Southern Buckeye in 1987. The Bulldogs were part of the league from 1919–1985, and 1989 to present day. In the years of 1985–1989, Batavia Athletics were part of the Miami Valley Conference. As of the 2014–2015 school year, however, Batavia High School switched Divisions within the SBAAC, going from National to American.

Several individuals and Teams have made State Pride, with several state champions:

Individual
 Leroy Smith – 1949 state champion, 440 meter dash/track
 Lynn Beck – 1964 state champion, high jump/track
 Don Ogletree – 1964 and 1964 state champion, 440 meter dash/track
 Dave Smith – 1966 state champion, 100 yard dash/track
 Grady Reid, Jr. – 1971 state champion, 880 meter run/track, 1970 state runner-up, 880 meter run/track
 Terry Shinkle- 1991 and 1992 state runner-up, 125 lb. wrestling

Team
 Boys' Track – state runner-up
 Boys' Track – 1965 state runner-up
 Boys' Track – 1966 state champions

Athletic Hall of Fame 
Batavia High School features an Athletic Hall of Fame, showcasing numerous athletes in the Main Hall of the High School who have achieved records and or fame with either the high school or later in life.
 Mel Hoderlein Class of 1942
 Herb Hoberg Class of 1933
 Grady Reid, Jr. Class of 1977
 Leroy Smith Class of 1949
 Chris Kent Class of 2000
 Terry Shinkle Class of 1992
 Chad Kelley Class of 2000
 Dave Miller Class of 1990
 Lynn Beck Class of 1964
 Kristine Dabbelt Class of 1999
 Larry Smith Class of 1987
 Eugene Johnson Class of 1980
 Amber Bishop Kelley Class of 2000
 Rick Crawford
 Robert Clousson Varsity Basketball and Track Coach
 Rhonda Murphy Class of 1989
 Scott Dotson Class of 1975
 Joel Gallimore Class of 1994
 Richard Dial Class of 1924
 Keith Crider Class of 1986
 Brent Bein Class of 1998
 Walt Carver Class of 1987
 Chris Kennedy Class of 1990
 George Knapp Athletic Director 1964-1989
 Dennis "Ike" Clepper Class of 1998
 Dave Smith Class of 1967
 Robert Hewitt Class of 1986
 Boys' Basketball Teams 1964, 1965, 1966
 Don Ogletree Class of 1966
 Rob Miller Class of 1983
 William Kennedy Class of 1987
 Sandy Woods Class of 1986

Notable alumni
 Audrey Bolte, 2012 Miss Ohio winner
 Mel Hoderlein, former Major League Baseball player (Boston Red Sox, Washington Senators)
 Julius Penn, U.S. Army brigadier general in World War I

OHSAA State Championships
 Boys Track and Field - 1966

Notes and references

External links

 District Website
 

High schools in Clermont County, Ohio
Public high schools in Ohio